Peter Stamm (born 18 January 1963 in Münsterlingen) is a Swiss writer. His prize-winning books have been translated into more than thirty languages. For his entire body of work and his accomplishments in fiction, he was short-listed for the Booker Prize in 2013, and in 2014 he won the prestigious Friedrich Hölderlin Prize.

Life
Peter Stamm grew up in Weinfelden in the canton of Thurgau the son of an accountant.  After completing primary and secondary school he spent three years as an apprentice accountant and then five as an accountant. He then chose to go back to school at the University of Zurich taking courses in a variety of fields including English studies, Business informatics, Psychology, and Psychopathology.  During this time he also worked as an intern at a psychiatric clinic.  After living for a time in New York, Paris, and Scandinavia he settled down in 1990 as a writer and freelance journalist in Zurich.  He wrote articles for, among others, the Neue Zürcher Zeitung, the Tages-Anzeiger, Die Weltwoche, and the satirical newspaper Nebelspalter.  Since 1997 he has belonged to the editorial staff of the quarterly literary magazine "Entwürfe für Literatur." He lives in Winterthur.

Peter Stamm has written prose, radio drama, and plays. He is most known for his cool and sparse writing style.  Since 2003 Stamm has been a member of the group "Autorinnen und Autoren der Schweiz" (Authors of Switzerland).

In the fall term 2018 Peter Stamm was the tenth Friedrich Dürrenmatt Guest Professor for World Literature at the University of Bern.

Prizes
Stamm has received a number of literature prizes. 
1998: Ehrengabe des Kantons Zürich
1999: Rauris Literature Prize
2000: Rheingau Literatur Preis
2001: Ehrengabe der Stadt Zürich
2002: Preis der Schweizerischen Schillerstiftung
2002: Carl-Heinrich-Ernst-Kunstpreis
2013: Frank O'Connor International Short Story Award shortlist We're Flying
2014: Friedrich-Hölderlin-Preis of the town of Bad Homburg
2017: Schiller Prize of the Zürcher Kantonalbank
2017: Johann-Friedrich-von-Cotta-Literatur- und Übersetzerpreis der Landeshauptstadt Stuttgart for Weit über das Land
2018: Solothurner Literaturpreis
2018: Heinrich-Heine guest lectureship
2018: Swiss Book Prize for Die sanfte Gleichgültigkeit der Welt

Works

Prose
 Alles über den Mann,  1995 (with Brigitte Fries)
 Gotthard, 1997 (with Markus Bühler)
 Agnes, 1998 (translated by Michael Hofmann as Agnes, Other Press, 2016)
 Blitzeis, 1999 (translated by Michael Hofmann as "Black Ice" in the first section of In Strange Gardens, Other Press, 2006)
 Ungefähre Landschaft, 2001 (translated by Michael Hofmann as Unformed Landscape, Other Press, 2005)
 In fremden Gärten, 2003 (translated by Michael Hofmann in the second section of In Strange Gardens, Other Press, 2006)
 Warum wir vor der Stadt wohnen, 2005 (with Jutta Bauer)
 An einem Tag wie diesem, 2006 (translated by Michael Hofmann as On a Day Like This, Other Press, 2008)
 Wir fliegen, 2008 (translated by Michael Hofmann in the first section of We're Flying, Other Press, 2012)
 Sieben Jahre, 2009 (translated by Michael Hofmann as Seven Years, Other Press, 2011)
 Seerücken, 2011 (translated by Michael Hofmann as "The Ridge" in the second section of We're Flying, Other Press, 2012)
 Nacht ist der Tag, 2013 (translated by Michael Hofmann as All Days are Night, Other Press, 2014)
 Weit über das Land, 2016 (translated by Michael Hofmann as To the Back of Beyond, Other Press, 2017)
 Die sanfte Gleichgültigkeit der Welt, 2018 (translated by Michael Hofmann as The Sweet Indifference of the World, Other Press, 2020)

Plays
 Die Planung des Planes Monologue, Schauspielhaus Zürich
 Fremd gehen, 1995
 Après Soleil oder Wen der Wind zur Insel trägt, 2002
 Der Kuss des Kohaku, 2004
 Die Töchter von Taubenhain, 2004

Radio dramas
 Ich und die anderen 1991
 Die Nacht der Gewohnheiten 1993
 In Vitro Zürich 1994
 Der letzte Autofahrer 1995
 Bildnis eines Knaben mit Peitsche 1995

Editor
 Diensttage, 2003

Translations
 Susan Musgrave: Träum dir eine Badewanne (English: Dreams are More Real than Bathtubs), 2002

In translation
Several of Stamm's works have been translated into English by Michael Hofmann, and published in the United States by Other Press.  These include novels Seven Years, Agnes, Unformed Landscape, and On a Day Like This, as well as In Strange Gardens and Other Stories, a collection of short stories.

References

External links

 Peter Stamm's website 
 Peter Stamm page at Other Press
 Peter Stamm interviewed by the New Yorker
 Peter Stamm interviewed by close-up weblog

1963 births
Living people
People from Kreuzlingen District
Swiss dramatists and playwrights
Male dramatists and playwrights
Swiss male writers
Swiss accountants
University of Zurich alumni
People from Weinfelden
Swiss Book Prize winners